Strange Pleasures is the second studio album by London-based dream pop band Still Corners. It was released 7 May 2013 by US label Sub Pop.

The album reached a peak of No. 28 in the Billboard Top Heatseekers chart. It also hit No. 1 in the FMQB national radio charts.

Track listing
All tracks written by Greg Hughes:

References

External links
Strange Pleasures on Subpop.com
Still Corners

2013 albums
Still Corners albums
Sub Pop albums